Michael Jenkins (born 1946) is an Australian writer, producer and film and television director.

He is the creator of the crime drama television series Scales of Justice, Blue Murder and Wildside, all of which deal with corruption in the New South Wales police force. He also directed the cult film The Heartbreak Kid, and its spin-off series Heartbreak High.

Jenkins is one of the most highly regarded Australian directors of the 1990s, known for his distinctive, gritty style, particularly for his use of multiple hand-held cameras and semi-improvised dialogue.

Jenkins garnered controversy in 2007, when he was announced as the director of The Wrong Girl, a film about the Sydney gang rapes in 2000, written with Nicholas Hammond. The film ceased production after criticism from Premier Morris Iemma and Deputy Premier John Watkins.

Filmography

Film

Television

References

External links

Michael Jenkins at Australian Screen Online
Michael Jenkins at AustLit (subscription required)

1946 births
Living people
Australian directors